Pedaso is a comune (municipality) in the Province of Fermo in the Italian region Marche, located about  southeast of Ancona and about  northeast of Ascoli Piceno.
Pedaso borders the following municipalities: Altidona, Campofilone.

Demographic evolution From 1861 to 2001

References

External links
 www.comunedipedaso.it/

Cities and towns in the Marche